Salvatore Andrea Molina (born 1 January 1992) is an Italian professional footballer who plays as a midfielder or winger for  club Bari.

Club career

Atalanta 
Born in Garbagnate Milanese, Molina joined Atalanta's youth system in 2001, aged nine.

Loan to Foggia 
On 10 July 2011, he was loaned to U.S. Foggia, alongside Alessandro De Leidi.

Molina played his first match as a professional on 7 August 2011, starting in a Coppa Italia 3–0 home win against Trapani. He made his league debut on 4 September, starting in a 1–2 home loss against Benevento, and scored his first goal on 11 December, netting the first of a 3–1 home success over Ternana.

Loan to Barletta 
On 29 August 2012, Molina joined Barletta in a season-long loan deal. He was an ever-present figure for the club, scoring two goals in 31 appearances.

Loan to Modena 
On 17 July 2013, Molina and team-mate Doudou Mangni moved to Modena on loan. He made his Serie B debut on 24 August, playing the full 90 minutes in a 1–1 home draw against Palermo.

Molina scored his first goal in the division on 29 December in a 1–1 draw at Cesena. He later netted a brace in a 4–0 home defeat of Bari on 16 February of the following year, and finished the campaign with 39 matches and four goals, with his side being knocked out in the play-offs.

Return to Atalanta 
On 20 June 2014, Molina returned to Atalanta, and made his Serie A debut on 21 September, replacing Boukary Dramé in the 82nd minute of a 0–1 home loss against Fiorentina.

Loan to Cesena 
On 10 July 2015, Molina was signed by A.C. Cesena in a temporary deal, with an option to purchase.

Loan to Perugia 
On 1 February 2016, Molina was transferred to Perugia in another temporary deal.

Loan to Avellino 
On 31 August 2016, Molina was signed by Avellino in a temporary deal.

Crotone 
On 8 August 2018, Molina signed with Serie B club Crotone. Crotone were promoted to Serie A for the 2020–21 season.

Monza 
On 5 January 2022, Molina signed for Monza in Serie B on a one-and-a-half-year deal. Once again, Molina helped his club receive promotion to Serie A at the end of the 2021–22 season.

Bari 
On 31 January 2023, Molina signed with Bari in Serie B until the end of the 2022–23 season.

International career
Molina represented Italy at the under-20 level in four friendlies: against Switzerland twice and Poland in the Under-20 Four Nations Tournament, as well as against Ghana.

Career statistics

References

External links

 Profile at A.C. Monza 
 
 

1992 births
Living people
Sportspeople from the Metropolitan City of Milan
Footballers from Lombardy
Italian footballers
Association football midfielders
Association football wingers
Atalanta B.C. players
Calcio Foggia 1920 players
A.S.D. Barletta 1922 players
Modena F.C. players
A.C. Carpi players
A.C. Cesena players
A.C. Perugia Calcio players
U.S. Avellino 1912 players
F.C. Crotone players
A.C. Monza players
S.S.C. Bari players
Serie C players
Serie B players
Serie A players
Italy youth international footballers
Italy under-21 international footballers